3rd Cavalry, 3rd Cavalry Division, 3rd Cavalry Brigade or 3rd Cavalry Regiment may refer to:

Corps
 III Cavalry Corps (Grande Armée)
 III Cavalry Corps (German Empire)

Divisions
 3rd Cavalry Division (German Empire)
 3rd Cavalry Division (Reichswehr)
 3rd Cavalry Division Amedeo Duca d'Aosta, of the Italian Army
 3rd Cavalry Division (United Kingdom)
 3rd Cavalry Division (United States)

Brigades
 3rd Cavalry Brigade (Australia)
 3rd (Ambala) Cavalry Brigade, of the Indian Army in the First World War
 3rd (Meerut) Cavalry Brigade, of the Indian Army in the Second World War
 3rd Cavalry Brigade (Imperial Japanese Army)
 3rd Cavalry Brigade (Poland)
 3rd Cavalry Brigade (United Kingdom)
 3rd Brigade Combat Team, 1st Cavalry Division (United States)

Regiments and battalions
 3rd Cavalry Regiment (Australia)
 3rd Cavalry (India)
 3rd Bengal Cavalry, of the Indian Army
 3rd Bengal Light Cavalry, of the East India Company
 3rd Madras Cavalry, of the East India Company
 3d Armored Cavalry Squadron (South Vietnam)
 3rd Cavalry Regiment (United States)
 3rd Arkansas Cavalry, a Confederate regiment of the American Civil War
 3rd Arkansas Cavalry Regiment, a Confederate regiment of the American Civil War
 3rd Arkansas Cavalry Regiment (Union), a Union regiment of the American Civil War
 3rd Colorado Cavalry Regiment, a Union regiment of the American Civil War
 3rd Regiment Indiana Cavalry, a Union regiment of the American Civil War
 3rd Regiment Illinois Volunteer Cavalry, a Union regiment of the American Civil War
 3rd Regiment Iowa Volunteer Cavalry, a Union regiment of the American Civil War
 3rd Regiment Kentucky Volunteer Cavalry, a Union regiment of the American Civil War
 3rd Michigan Volunteer Cavalry Regiment, a Union regiment of the American Civil War
 3rd Ohio Cavalry, a Union regiment of the American Civil War
 3rd Virginia Cavalry, a Confederate regiment of the American Civil War
 3rd West Virginia Volunteer Cavalry Regiment, a Union regiment of the American Civil War
 3rd Wisconsin Volunteer Cavalry Regiment, a Union regiment of the American Civil War